Getting It Dunn is the sixth album by country music artist Holly Dunn. Released in 1992, it includes the singles "No Love Have I", "As Long as You Belong to Me" and "Golden Years". The Verlon Thompson/Beth Nielsen Chapman-written "You Say You Will" was almost simultaneously covered by Trisha Yearwood on her album Hearts in Armor, in the same year of 1992. Terry Radigan later released "Half a Million Teardrops" as a single in 1995.

Dunn produced the album with Paul Worley and Ed Seay, except for the track "Let Go", which she produced with her older brother, singer-songwriter Chris Waters.

Track listing

Personnel
 Dennis Burnside - piano
 Larry Byrom - electric guitar
 Carol Chase - backing vocals 
 Joe Chemay - bass guitar
 Sonny Garrish - steel guitar
 Rob Hajacos - fiddle
 Bill Hullett - acoustic guitar, electric guitar
 Wendy S. Johnson - backing vocals
 Anthony Martin - keyboards, backing vocals
 Brent Mason - electric guitar
 The Nashville String Machine - strings
 Steve Nathan - piano
 Deanie Richardson - fiddle
 Tom Robb - bass guitar
 Gary Smith - piano
 Biff Watson - acoustic guitar 
 Dennis Wilson - backing vocals
 Paul Worley - acoustic guitar, electric guitar 
 Curtis Young - backing vocals
 Rusty Young - steel guitar

References

1992 albums
Holly Dunn albums
Warner Records albums
Albums produced by Paul Worley